The N2 road is one of the national highways of Gabon. It connects to the north and across into Cameroon.

Towns located along the highway include:

Anonébéré
Bifoun 
Alembe 
Viate 
Mitzic 
Bibasse 
Oyem 
Bitam 
Éboro – (Cameroon)

National highways in Gabon